The 2022–23 Croatian Women's Football Cup is the 32nd season of the annual Croatian football cup competition. Twenty six teams will participate in the competition, all eight teams from the 2022–23 Croatian Women's First Football League and all teams from second level. The competition started on 4 September 2022.

Matches

Preliminary round

Round of 16

Quarter-finals

References

External links
Competition rules 

2022 in Croatian women's sport
2023 in Croatian women's sport
Women's football in Croatia
Football competitions in Croatia